The DermIS (Dermatology Internet Service or Dermatology Information System) is a web site providing images and information on diagnosis in dermatology.  It is a project of the Department of Clinical Social Medicine of the University of Heidelberg and the Department of Dermatology of the University of Erlangen, and provides information in seven languages: Turkish, Japanese, Portuguese, Spanish, French, German and English.  It includes the Dermatology Online Atlas (DOIA), a database of images of conditions.

See also 
 List of cutaneous conditions

References

External links 
 Dermatology Information System official website

German medical websites
Medical photography and illustration